The Men's time trial of the 2019 UCI Road World Championships was a cycling event that took place on 25 September 2019 in Harrogate, England. It was the 26th edition of the championship, for which Rohan Dennis of Australia was the defending champion, having won in 2018. 57 riders from 38 nations entered the competition.

Dennis successfully defended his title, becoming the first rider since Tony Martin (2011–2013) to retain the rainbow jersey for the time trial. Dennis finished 1 minute, 8.93 seconds ahead of the European champion Remco Evenepoel from Belgium. The bronze medal was won by Filippo Ganna of Italy, finishing 2.16 seconds ahead of fourth-placed Patrick Bevin from New Zealand; Ganna finished 1 minute, 55 seconds down on Dennis.

Course

The race consisted of a route  in length, starting from Northallerton and ending in Harrogate.

Qualification
The outgoing World Champion and the current continental champions were also able to take part in addition to those who were entered by qualifying nations.

Participating nations
57 cyclists from 38 nations competed in the event. The number of cyclists per nation is shown in parentheses.

Final classification

All 57 race starters completed the -long course.

References

External links

Men's time trial
UCI Road World Championships – Men's time trial
2019 in men's road cycling